This is a list of American Football Teams in the Netherlands.

AFBN Premier League (Eredivisie)

2021/2022 season lineup
 Amsterdam Crusaders
 Amsterdam Panthers
 Arnhem Falcons
 Groningen Giants
 010 Trojans
 Flevo Phantoms
 Lelystad Commanders
 Hilversum Hurricanes

AFBN First Division (Eerste divisie)

Alphen Eagles
Eindhoven Raptors
Den Haag Raiders
Spijkenisse Scouts
Maastricht Wildcats 
Nijmegen Pirates
Tilburg Wolves
Utrecht Dominators
Leiden Lightning
West Frisian Outlawz

Combination Teams
Krakens (Raptors + Wolves + Scouts)
Parrots (Eagles + Pirates)

QFL (Queens Football League)
2021/2022 season lineup
Amsterdam Cats
Rotterdam Ravens
Almere Foxes
0’30 Wolverines
The Hague Black Scorpions
Zwolle Blue Jays
Eindhoven Valkyries

No Senior Tackle Team
Amersfoort Untouchables
Purmerend Barbarians
CSB Eagles

Defunct

NFL Europe
Amsterdam Admirals

AFBN
Delft Dragons

See also 
American Football in the Netherlands
List of American football teams in Belgium

References

American football teams in the Netherlands